The Queen Victoria Hospital (QVH), located in East Grinstead, West Sussex, England is the specialist reconstructive surgery centre for the south east of England, and also provides services at clinics across the region. It has become world-famous for its pioneering burns and plastic surgery.  The hospital was named after Queen Victoria. It is managed by the Queen Victoria Hospital NHS Foundation Trust.

Proposals that the trust should be taken over by University Hospitals Sussex NHS Foundation Trust in 2021 were objected to by the governors of the trust.  In September 2021 66% of the consultants said they had no confidence in the chief executive.  In September 2022 the merger plans were abandoned.

History

Founded as East Grinstead Cottage Hospital in 1863, the hospital adopted the name, "Queen Victoria Hospital", in the 1930s and moved to its present site in 1936.

During the Second World War, it developed as a specialist burns unit under the leadership of Sir Archibald McIndoe, and became world-famous for pioneering treatment of RAF and allied aircrew who were badly burned or crushed and required reconstructive plastic surgery. It was where the Guinea Pig Club was formed in 1941, as a social club and support network for the aircrew and their family members. The club continued to provide assistance for Guinea Pigs for many years after the war, and met regularly in East Grinstead until 2007. The Queen Victoria Hospital remains at the forefront of specialist care today, and is renowned for its burns treatment facilities and expertise throughout England.

In recent years a major programme of site developments has been underway to replace the ageing estate. In 2012, a new outpatients department opened, along with refurbished burns and paediatric units. Six new operating theatres were opened by the Princess Royal in October 2013.

Services
The hospital is the regional centre of excellence for burns and for reconstructive surgery – the use of specialist techniques such as tissue transplant and microvascular surgery in the restoration of people who have suffered disfigurement or destructive damage from disease, trauma, major surgery, or congenitally. Specialist units that carry out these services include:

 Burns Centre: The QVH Burns Centre provides specialist burns care treatment for people living in the South East of England. The hospital was involved in controversy in August 2007 when it turned away an 8-month-old burn victim arriving by air ambulance. The row was finally resolved with both sides agreeing to disagree over the issue. In conjunction with the Kent Police, a young woman who was seriously burned by a firework and treated at Queen Victoria Hospital has made a video telling her story to help other young people understand the dangers that fireworks present.  The paediatrics burns inpatient service was closed in 2019.
 Corneo Plastic Unit: The Corneo Plastic Unit was established by Sir Benjamin Rycroft in the 1940s.  The unit specialises in corneal transplantation surgery and oculoplastics. The eye bank, previously named the National Eye Bank at the Queen Victoria Hospital, was established formally in 1952. Sir Benjamin Rycroft was instrumental in the passage of the Tissue Procurement Act, a key piece of legislation with respect to all transplant surgery in the UK. The Corneo Plastic and Ophthalmology unit continues to perform corneal transplantation, lamellar grafts, and stem cell transplantation for occular surface rehabilitation. Raman Malhotra, consultant ophthalmologist at the hospital, discovered a method of treating Blepharospasm using filters.
 Plastic Surgery Unit: The hospital is a major centre for Plastic Surgery. Hand surgery is also performed at the hospital. Videos of complex hand operations have been shared on YouTube by Mr Harry Belcher, a consultant hand surgeon at the hospital. A man had his arm successfully reattached in a 14-hour operation by surgeons at Queen Victoria Hospital, after he accidentally cut it off with a 'chainsaw'. After the operation he regained use of his fingers.
 Maxillofacial Surgery: The Maxillofacial unit has an international reputation as a training and teaching unit, with staff specialising in oral surgery, orthodontics, facial trauma, head and neck cancer, orthognathic surgery, salivary gland disease, face and jaw reconstruction, and developmental facial deformity. The unit performed major reconstructive surgery on a Crawley woman who was savaged by her own dog.
 Therapies Department: The Therapies Department support the rehabilitation of patients undergoing specialist treatment at the hospital.  It also provides a wide range of services for the local community, including physiotherapy, back pain clinics, speech and language therapy, weight management clinics and Parkinson's groups.  The department is also part of the first and largest multidisciplinary expert facial palsy team, treating palsy and paralysis patients from across the country.

In July 2012, the hospital produced a short film about its services: the Queen Victoria Hospital Short Film 2012.

Telemedicine
As the regional specialist centre for reconstructive surgery following trauma, Queen Victoria Hospital (QVH) has a well-established telemedicine referral system. In 2008 the service won the regional Innovation and Communications Technology Award and the QVH telemedicine system was also chosen to form part of the Institute of Engineering & Technology's 2008 Faraday Lecture on the overall theme of engineering in health and has been included in a documentary.

Performance
In the national cancer patient survey for 2011/12, the hospital achieved the highest score for care quality out of all 160 hospital trusts providing cancer services. Ninety-four per cent of cancer patients surveyed rated the care they received at QVH as 'excellent' or 'very good'.

In the national NHS inpatient survey for 2011, the hospital achieved the highest scores in the country for 27 of the 61 questions asked, including 'Overall, how would you rate the care you received?'.

In the 2011 national NHS staff survey, 94% of doctors and nurses said they would recommend their hospital to friends and family, more than at any other hospital in the country.

In 2011, it was found to be the most recommended NHS hospital in the country by the independent Dr Foster Hospital Guide.

It was named by the Health Service Journal as one of the top hundred NHS trusts to work for in 2015.  At that time it had 817 full-time equivalent staff and a sickness absence rate of 3.58%. 91% of staff recommend it as a place for treatment and 74% recommended it as a place to work.

In 2018/9 it faced a £5.9 million deficit, around 10% of its turnover, and needed to borrow money to pay its bills.  It forecasts deficits of around £7 million, roughly 10% of its turnover, each year from 2019 to 2023.

Transport links
Local bus services are provided by Metrobus. The following routes pass the hospital:
Route 281: an hourly service which links QVH to the town centre and station, Worsted Farm, Imberhorne, Felbridge, Crawley Down, Copthorne, Three Bridges, Crawley, Lingfield and Dormansland
Route 400: an hourly service which links QVH to the town centre, Felbridge, Copthorne, Three Bridges, Crawley, Horley, East Surrey Hospital, Redhill, Godstone and Caterham

See also
 Healthcare in Sussex
 List of hospitals in England

References

Further reading

External links 
 Trust website

Hospitals in West Sussex
East Grinstead
NHS hospitals in England
Archibald McIndoe
1863 establishments in England